Branka Batinić is a Croatian and former Yugoslav international table tennis player, who participated in six world championships and represented Yugoslavia over 250 times in tournaments in the 1970s and 1980s.

Table tennis career
She won a bronze medal at the 1981 World Table Tennis Championships in the mixed doubles with Dragutin Šurbek.

She is active in the Veteran's Championships in Europe and coach.

See also
 List of table tennis players
 List of World Table Tennis Championships medalists

References

Living people
Yugoslav table tennis players
Croatian female table tennis players
Croatian table tennis coaches
1958 births